Savarkundla is one of the 182 Legislative Assembly constituencies of Gujarat state in India. It is part of Amreli district and it came into existence after 2008 delimitation.

List of segments

This assembly seat represents the following segments,

 Savarkundla Taluka
 Lilia Taluka – Entire taluka except villages – Kankot Nana, Rajkot Nana

Members of Legislative Assembly

Election results

2022

2017

2012

See also
 List of constituencies of Gujarat Legislative Assembly
 Gujarat Legislative Assembly

References

External links
 

Assembly constituencies of Gujarat
Amreli district